Arthur Frederick Payne (7 December 1831 at Leicester – 23 July 1910 at Brighton, Sussex) was an English amateur cricketer who played first-class cricket from 1854 to 1867.  He was the twin brother of Alfred Payne.

Payne was a student at Trinity College, Oxford, matriculating in 1851 and graduating B.A. in 1856. A right-handed batsman who was mainly associated with Oxford University and Marylebone Cricket Club (MCC), he made 10 known appearances in first-class matches.

References

External links
 CricketArchive profile

Further reading
 Arthur Haygarth, Scores & Biographies, Volumes 4-10 (1849-1868), Lillywhite, 1862-69

1831 births
1910 deaths
English cricketers
English cricketers of 1826 to 1863
English cricketers of 1864 to 1889
Marylebone Cricket Club cricketers
Oxford University cricketers
Twin sportspeople
English twins
Gentlemen of England cricketers
Alumni of Trinity College, Oxford
Gentlemen of Marylebone Cricket Club cricketers